Wilmarth is a surname. Notable people with the surname include:

Anna Wilmarth Ickes (1873–1935), American politician and activist
Christopher Wilmarth (1943–1987), American sculptor
Dick Wilmarth (died 2018), American miner and dog racer
Lemuel Wilmarth (1835–1918), American painter
William H. Wilmarth (1904–1999), American sound engineer